Carolyn P. Collette  is an American literary critic and a specialist in medieval literature, particularly Geoffrey Chaucer's The Canterbury Tales. She is Professor Emerita of English Language and Literature at Mount Holyoke College, and a research associate at the Centre for Medieval Studies at the University of York, in England.

Background
Collette received her B.A. from Mount Holyoke College and Ph.D. from the University of Massachusetts Amherst.

Select bibliography

Books
 Species, Phantasms and Images: Vision and Medieval Psychology in the Canterbury Tales. Ann Arbor: University of Michigan Press, 2001.
 Finding Common Ground: A Guide to Personal, Professional and Public Writing, with Richard Johnson, 2nd ed. (New York: Addison Wesley Longman), 1997.

Articles
  "A Closer Look at Seinte Cecile's Special Vision," The Chaucer Review, 10, 1976, 337–49.
 "Sense and Sensibility in The Prioress' Tale," The Chaucer Review, 15, 1981, 138–150.
 "Ubi Peccaverant, Ibi Punirentur: The Oak Tree and The Pardoner's Tale," The Chaucer Review, 19, 1985, 39–45.
 "Umberto Eco, Semiotics and The Merchant's Tale," The Chaucer Review, 24, 1989, 132–38.
 "Chaucer and Victorian Medievalism: Culture and Society," Poetica: An International Journal of Linguistic-Literary Studies, Vol. 29–30, 1989, 115–125.
 "Chaucer's Discourse of Mariology," in Art and Context in Late Medieval English Narrative, ed. Robert Edwards, by D.S. Brewer, 1994, 127–147.
 "Heeding the Counsel of Prudence: A Context for the Melibee," The Chaucer Review, 29, 1995, 416–433.

Notes

External links
Official site
Book review

American medievalists
Women medievalists
American literary critics
Women literary critics
Mount Holyoke College alumni
Mount Holyoke College faculty
Living people
Year of birth missing (living people)
American women historians
21st-century American women
American women critics